High Prairie School Division is a public school authority within the Canadian province of Alberta operated out of High Prairie. Located along the south side of Lesser Slave Lake, High Prairie School Division provides educational services to a population of over 23,000 people within its service region. The division operates 12 schools with approximately 3,000 students, 200 teachers, and over 140 support staff.

Board of Trustees 
The Board of Trustees for High Prairie School Division is made up of 7 elected trustees across 4 wards. Ward 1 covers the hamlets of Falher, Donnelly, and surrounding communities. Ward 2 covers the Town of High Prairie and surrounding communities. Ward 3 covers the hamlets of Joussard and Kinuso and surrounding lake-shore communities. Ward 4 covers the Town of Slave Lake and surrounding communities.

Schools 
High Prairie School Division operates 12 schools across northern Alberta. The schools are located in a region from Falher, Alberta to Slave Lake, Alberta.

See also 
List of school authorities in Alberta

References

External links 

School districts in Alberta